John Winebrenner (March 25, 1797September 12, 1860), founded the Churches of God General Conference.

Life
Winebrenner was born in Walkersville, Maryland. He studied at Dickinson College, Carlisle, Pennsylvania, and was ordained in the German Reformed Church in 1820. He pastored at Harrisburg, Pennsylvania, where his revival preaching and his Revival Hymn-Book (1825) brought about a break between his followers and the Reformed Church.

His Christian testimony can be found in the book The Testimony of a Hundred Witnesses (1858) edited by John Frederick Weishampel. In 1830, he and five other ministers founded the Church of God (whose members are sometimes called "Winebrennerians"). He served as speaker at the first eldership and subsequently edited and published the Church of God paper, first called The Gospel Publisher (1835–1845) and later The Church Advocate (beginning in 1845).

He died in Harrisburg, Pennsylvania, and was interred at the Harrisburg Cemetery.

Bibliography
A Prayer Meeting and Revival Hymn Book (First issued in 1825, this book (words only) went through over twenty editions.
A Brief View, of the Formation, Government and Discipline, of the Church of God (First issued in 1829)
A Sermon on Christian Baptism (Harrisburg, 1830)
Das Christliche Gesang=Buch (First issued in 1834)
Reference and Pronouncing Testament (First issued in 1836)
A Popular Treatise on Regeneration (First issued in 1844)
The Seraphina (Harrisburg, 1854)
The Church Hymn Book (First issued in 1859)
Doctrinal and Practical Sermons (First issued in book form in 1860)
The History of all the Religious Denominations in the United States (First issued in 1844 with I. Daniel Rupp.)

References

External links

The Testimony of a Hundred Witnesses (1858)
HISTORY of the Churches of God in NORTH AMERICA (1926)
Church of God in Middletown Borough, Dauphin County, Pennsylvania.   Founded by John Weinbrenner in 1832.

1797 births
1860 deaths
American Calvinist and Reformed ministers
Burials at Harrisburg Cemetery
Churches of God Christians
Dickinson College alumni
19th-century American clergy